Colne Valley is a constituency represented in the House of Commons of the UK Parliament since 2019 by Jason McCartney of the Conservative Party.

Constituency profile
The seat is named after the Colne; one of three rivers so-named in the UK and one of three main rivers in the seat; its three main towns sit on hillsides and moorland and the local dwellings are mainly stone-built.  A sizeable proportion of retirees live in the area, celebrated in the decades-long television comedy Last of the Summer Wine, centred on Holmfirth in the seat. The wider Colne and Holme Valleys still retain some agriculture such as the Longley Farm dairy whose products are sold nationwide. The south-west of the constituency, bordering with Oldham and High Peak, Derbyshire, is within the Peak District and the area includes Marsden Moor Estate. Moving eastwards, the constituency also includes some of Huddersfield's western suburbs such as generally affluent Lindley, and Crosland Moor which is more mixed, diverse and inner-city, on the border with Huddersfield Town Centre. In between Marsden and Huddersfield, the former mill town of Slaithwaite was named the best place to live in Yorkshire by The Times in 2022.

Political history
In the three decades post-World War II, the area had the distinction of being one of the few Labour/Liberal marginals, changing hands between the parties on several occasions. Since 1983, it has been a three-way marginal seat. It was a bellwether constituency from the 1987 general election to the 2017 general election, which saw Labour's Thelma Walker narrowly gain the seat from the Conservatives while the latter remained the largest party in Parliament. The Liberal Democrats retained much of their strength in the area until the 2010 general election, but in 2017; they lost their deposit with just 4.1% of the vote. Since the 1964 general election, the only occasion when the winning candidate's majority exceeded 10% of the votes cast was in 1992, and three different parties have held the seat during this period. Since 1987 it has been won by either Conservative or Labour candidates.

Colne Valley was one of 17 seats won (held or gained) by a Labour candidate in 2017 from a total of 22 covering its county, with Thelma Walker's 2017 win being one of 30 net gains of the Labour Party. However, former MP Jason McCartney took the seat back for the Conservatives in 2019.

Boundaries 

1885–1918: The Municipal Borough of Huddersfield, and parts of the Sessional Divisions of Saddleworth and Upper Aggbrigg.

1918–1950: The Urban Districts of Farnley Tyas, Golcar, Holme, Holmfirth, Honley, Linthwaite, Marsden, Meltham, New Mill, Saddleworth, Scammonden, Slaithwaite, South Crosland, Springhead, and Thurstonland.

1950–1983: The Urban Districts of Colne Valley, Holmfirth, Kirkburton, Meltham, and Saddleworth.

1983–2010: The Metropolitan Borough of Kirklees wards of Colne Valley West, Crosland Moor, Golcar, Holme Valley North, Holme Valley South, and Lindley.

2010–present: The Metropolitan Borough of Kirklees wards of Colne Valley, Crosland Moor and Netherton, Golcar, Holme Valley North, Holme Valley South, and Lindley.

This semi-rural constituency covers the Colne Valley, Holme Valley, Meltham and the outskirts of the large town of Huddersfield in the district of Kirklees, West Yorkshire. In addition to the Huddersfield suburbs of Crosland Moor, Golcar, Netherton, and Lindley, the constituency comprises rural countryside broken up by the towns of Holmfirth and Meltham and the villages of Marsden, Slaithwaite, Honley, Brockholes, Linthwaite, New Mill and Golcar. The seat was once held by the Independent Labour MP Victor Grayson, who later disappeared in mysterious circumstances in 1920.

The area of Saddleworth, which actually lies on the Western side of the Pennines compared to the rest of the constituency and is separate from the main Colne Valley itself, became part of the new  metropolitan county of Greater Manchester in 1974, and from 1983 became part of a new constituency along with Littleborough.

In 1981, the Boundary Commission's proposals combined much of the seat with a large portion of the Huddersfield West seat. Originally it was proposed to use the Huddersfield West name, but this was opposed at the public inquiry which argued that the Colne Valley name be preserved.

Members of Parliament

Elections

Elections in the 2010s

Elections in the 2000s

Elections in the 1990s

Elections in the 1980s

There had been significant boundary changes for this election, mainly due to the 1974 changes to local government, where the Saddleworth area was moved out of Yorkshire into the Oldham borough of Greater Manchester and became part of the Littleborough and Saddleworth constituency. To compensate, some of the western outskirts of Huddersfield were added to Colne Valley from the abolished Huddersfield West constituency. Therefore, although Wainwright was the incumbent MP for Colne Valley, it was estimated that had the seat been fought on the new boundaries in 1979, the Labour Party would have won it with a majority of 2,239.

Elections in the 1970s

Elections in the 1960s

Elections in the 1950s

Elections in the 1940s

Elections in the 1930s

Elections in the 1920s

Elections in the 1910s

Election results 1885–1918

Elections in the 1880s

Elections in the 1890s

Elections in the 1900s

Elections in the 1910s 

General Election 1914–15:

Another General Election was required to take place before the end of 1915. The political parties had been making preparations for an election to take place and by the July 1914, the following candidates had been selected; 
Liberal: Charles Leach
Unionist: Archibald Boyd-Carpenter
Labour:

See also 
 List of parliamentary constituencies in West Yorkshire

Notes

References

Parliamentary constituencies in Yorkshire and the Humber
Constituencies of the Parliament of the United Kingdom established in 1885
Politics of Kirklees